Jeffrey Crompton, often stylized as "Geoff" or "Geff" (July 4, 1955 – January 7, 2002), was an American professional basketball player.

A 6'11 Parade All-American center from Walter M. Williams High School in Burlington, North Carolina, Crompton attended the University of North Carolina to play for future Hall of Fame coach Dean Smith in 1973.  Crompton played very sparingly for the Tar Heels, appearing in a total of 9 games from 1973–1977 due to academic and weight issues.  He played 27 games as a senior in 1977–78, averaging 3.5 points and 3.3 rebounds per game.

Following his collegiate career, Crompton was drafted in the fourth round of the 1978 NBA draft by the Kansas City Kings, and his rights were traded to the Denver Nuggets prior to the start of the season.  The next several years saw Crompton bouncing between the NBA and the Continental Basketball Association (CBA).  The highlight of his career may have been being named CBA Most Valuable Player in 1984 as a member of the Puerto Rico Coquis.  The Cleveland Cavaliers called him up at the end of that season, which would be his last in the NBA.

After his professional career ended, Crompton moved to Tallahassee, Florida, and managed a restaurant.  He worked for many years at UNC's summer basketball camps up until his death.  Geoff Crompton died on January 7, 2002, of leukemia.

Crompton's first name is generally spelled "Geff" in UNC records, but is often spelled "Geoff" in records of his NBA career.

References

1955 births
2002 deaths
African-American basketball players
American expatriate basketball people in the Netherlands
American men's basketball players
Basketball players from North Carolina
Centers (basketball)
Cleveland Cavaliers players
Deaths from leukemia
Denver Nuggets players
Kansas City Kings draft picks
Milwaukee Bucks players
Montana Golden Nuggets players
North Carolina Tar Heels men's basketball players
Parade High School All-Americans (boys' basketball)
People from Burlington, North Carolina
Puerto Rico Coquis players
Portland Trail Blazers players
San Antonio Spurs players
20th-century African-American sportspeople
21st-century African-American people